Smoke on the Water & Other Hits is a compilation album by the British rock band Deep Purple, released in 2001.

Track listing
All songs written by Ian Gillan, Ritchie Blackmore, Roger Glover, Jon Lord and Ian Paice, except where noted.

"Smoke on the Water" – 5:41
"Woman from Tokyo" – 5:49
"Burn" (Blackmore/Lord/Paice/Coverdale) – 6:03
"Child in Time" – 10:20
"Fireball" – 3:23
"Stormbringer" (Blackmore/Coverdale) – 4:08
"Never Before" – 4:00
"Gettin' Tighter" (Bolin/Hughes) – 3:36
"Black Night" – 3:27
"Highway Star" – 6:06

Personnel

Deep Purple
Ritchie Blackmore: guitar
Ian Gillan: vocals, harmonica, percussion (Tracks 1,2,4,5,7,9,10)
Roger Glover: bass (Tracks 1,2,4,5,7,9,10)
Ian Paice: drums, percussion
Jon Lord: keyboards, synthesizers, backing vocals
David Coverdale: lead vocals (Tracks 3,6,8)
Glenn Hughes: bass, vocals (Tracks 3,6,8)
Tommy Bolin: guitar, backing vocals (Track 8)

References

Deep Purple compilation albums
2001 compilation albums